K.P. Dandapani was the Advocate General of Kerala, India, from 2011 to 2016.

Early life
Dandapani was born in Kerala. He is the son of late V.K. Padmanabhan and M.K. Narayani. Dandapani completed his primary education from St. Albert's High School, Ernakulam. After his primary education, he joined for degree in St. Albert's college itself. After completion of his degree, he joined for professional degree course in Government Law College, Ernakulam. He completed his law degree and graduated in 1968 and enrolled as an advocate in the same year.

Career
K.P. Dandapani enrolled as an advocate on 17 May 1968. He started his legal practice under late S.Easwara Iyer, Senior Advocate. He started independent practice in the year 1972 with his wife Sumathi Dandapani. He was practicing in field of Civil, Company, Constitution and Criminal laws. In the year 1996, he was appointed as the Judge of Kerala High Court. However, five months after the appointment when he was transferred to Gujarat High Court.[He was terminated by President of India] In the year 2006 for non compliance of order., he became designated as the Senior Advocate by the Kerala High Court along with his wife. He is the legal adviser and standing counsel of many companies and establishments, including the PowerGrid Corporation of India, Leela Group of Companies, National Institute of Technology Calicut, Greater Cochin Development Authority, Thangal Kunju Musaliar College of Engineering, Kollam, Malabar Christian College, Kozhikode, and KITEX Group of Companies. He was the president of Kerala High Court Advocate's Association. He is one of the committee member of Kerala High Court Legal Service Authority.

Personal life
He is married to Sumathi and has two children. Daughter Mittu is a practicing lawyer in Australia and son Millu is a practicing lawyer of Kerala High Court. His wife Sumathi Dandapani is also a practicing Senior Advocate in Kerala High Court.

Notes

Living people
20th-century Indian lawyers
Malayali people
People from Ernakulam district
Advocates General for Indian states
Year of birth missing (living people)